Eva Senn (born 24 October 1952) is a Swiss former equestrian. She competed in two events at the 1996 Summer Olympics.

References

External links
 

1952 births
Living people
Swiss female equestrians
Swiss dressage riders
Olympic equestrians of Switzerland
Equestrians at the 1996 Summer Olympics
People from Solothurn
Sportspeople from the canton of Solothurn